George Warren McCrae Jr. (born October 19, 1944) is an American soul and disco singer who is most famous for his 1974 hit "Rock Your Baby".

Biography and career
McCrae was the second of nine children, born in West Palm Beach, Florida. He formed his own singing group, the Jivin' Jets, before joining the United States Navy in 1963. He married Gwen McCrae (née Mosley) in 1963. Four years later, he re-formed the group, with his wife Gwen joining the lineup, but soon afterwards they decided to work as a duo, recording for Henry Stone's Alston record label. Gwen then won a solo contract, with George acting as her manager as well as doing some singing on sessions and in clubs in Palm Beach.

He was about to return to college to study law enforcement, when Richard Finch and Harry Wayne Casey of KC and the Sunshine Band invited him to sing the lyrics for a song that they had recorded for the band, but could not reach the high notes that were required for the song. The original intention was that Gwen, his wife, should record it, but she was late for the session and George recorded alone. It suited his high-pitched voice to the extent that the song, "Rock Your Baby", became one of the first hits of the disco era in 1974, selling an estimated eleven million copies worldwide, topping the charts in the U.S. and the UK. The song was so successful that Rolling Stone magazine voted it the No. 1 song of the year in 1974. McCrae received a Grammy Award nomination for Best Male R&B Vocalist the following year.

Two further single releases, "I Can't Leave You Alone" and "It's Been So Long" also reached the UK Singles Chart Top 10. He recorded several further albums for TK, including George McCrae (1975) and Diamond Touch (1976), and also continued to record with, and manage, his wife until their divorce in 1976. They had two daughters together, Sophia and Leah.

While he continued to record albums including We Did It! and his second self-titled album George McCrae (both 1978), his commercial popularity slipped as the decade progressed. He married a second time, moved to Canada, and entered a period of semi-retirement, leaving TK at the end of the 1970s. With his second wife, he had another daughter, Jennifer McCray.

He returned with the album One Step Closer to Love in 1984, the title track from which entered the charts in the United Kingdom, Canada and the Netherlands. In 1988, he had a daughter, Marcella, with his then-girlfriend, Rosanna Molignini. He moved to the village Munstergeleen in the Netherlands and remarried again, to Dutch model Yvonne Bergsma, in 1989. They have a son, Shaka.

His later albums found some success in Europe, and he continued to perform regularly there. By the 2000s, he shared his time between homes in Florida, Aruba, and the Netherlands. In 2016 George McCrae released a new concept album called LOVE that was produced by the Dutch producer / composer Roger Heijster. The album was recorded without sequencing using only vintage instruments. Leah and Sophia McCrae, George's two daughters from his first marriage to Gwen McCrae, provide the backing vocals for this album. The album was album of the week in Germany and the single "Sexy Woman" was #1 in Mallorca. In December 2017, McCrae performed on the BBC's Hootenanny show hosted by Jools Holland.

Discography

Albums

Singles

See also
 List of soul musicians
 List of disco artists (F-K)
 List of artists who reached number one in the United States
 List of artists who reached number one on the UK Singles Chart
 List of performers on Top of the Pops
 List of artists who reached number one on the Billboard R&B chart
 List of Epic Records artists

Notes

References

External links

 Home page
 

1944 births
Living people
20th-century African-American male singers
American soul singers
People from West Palm Beach, Florida
Musicians from Miami
Jay Boy artists
American expatriates in the Netherlands
21st-century African-American people